Tillandsia cretacea is a species of flowering plant in the genus Tillandsia. This species is endemic to Mexico.

References

cretacea
Flora of Mexico